Alex James Hoehn (born December 22, 1997) is an American racing cyclist, who currently rides for amateur team Above & Beyond Cancer Cycling p/b Bike World.

Career
After playing hockey while growing up, Hoehn was introduced to cycling by his father at age 15, and by 18 he had permanently switched to cycling. He joined amateur team Tradewind Energy as a Cat 3, then joined  when he reached Cat 1 status.

In July 2018, he won the Under-23 United States National Road Race Championships in Maryland. In May 2019, he led the King of the Mountains classification following the conclusion of stages 3 and 4 of the Tour of California; ultimately finishing 2nd in the classification, as well as 5th in the young rider classification.

Major results
2017
 4th Overall Chico Stage Race
2018
 1st  Road race, National Under-23 Road Championships
 5th Overall Chico Stage Race
1st  Young rider classification
2019
 3rd Overall Joe Martin Stage Race
1st  Young rider classification
 3rd Overall Cascade Cycling Classic
1st  Young rider classification
 4th Overall Tour of the Gila
2020
 10th Malaysian International Classic Race
2021
 1st Grand Prix Erciyes - Mimar Sinan
 2nd Grand Prix Velo Alanya
 3rd Overall Tour du Rwanda
 5th Grand Prix Alanya
 8th Overall Tour of Mevlana
 8th Grand Prix Develi

References

External links
 

1997 births
Living people
American male cyclists
Sportspeople from Kansas